The 1926 St. Louis Cardinals season was the team's 45th season in St. Louis, Missouri and their 35th in the National League. The Cardinals went 89–65 during the season and finished first in the National League, winning their first National League pennant. In the World Series, they defeated the New York Yankees in 7 games, ending it by throwing out Babe Ruth at second base in the ninth inning of Game 7 to preserve a 3–2 victory. This was Rogers Hornsby's only full season as manager for the team.

Catcher Bob O'Farrell won the MVP Award this year, batting .293, with 7 home runs and 68 RBIs. Led by RBI champion Jim Bottomley, the offense scored the most runs in the NL.

Regular season
 September 22, 1926: Tommy Thevenow hit the second and last home run of the season, and of his career. Thevenow would play for another 12 seasons and set a major league record by not hitting a home run in 3,347 at-bats.

Season standings

Record vs. opponents

Notable transactions
 June 14, 1926: Heinie Mueller was traded by the Cardinals to the New York Giants for Billy Southworth.

Roster

Player stats

Batting

Starters by position
Note: Pos = Position; G = Games played; AB = At bats; H = Hits; Avg. = Batting average; HR = Home runs; RBI = Runs batted in

Other batters
Note: Pos = Position; G = Games played; AB = At bats; H = Hits; Avg. = Batting average; HR = Home runs; RBI = Runs batted in

Pitching

Starting pitchers
Note: G = Games pitched; IP = Innings pitched; W = Wins; L = Losses; ERA = Earned run average; SO = Strikeouts

Other pitchers
Note: G = Games pitched; IP = Innings pitched; W = Wins; L = Losses; ERA = Earned run average; SO = Strikeouts

Relief pitchers
Note: G = Games pitched; W = Wins; L = Losses; SV = Saves; ERA = Earned run average; SO = Strikeouts

Awards and honors

League top five finishers
Les Bell
 #3 in NL in RBI (100)
 #4 in NL in home runs (17)

Ray Blades
 #4 in NL in on-base percentage (.409)

Jim Bottomley
 NL leader in RBI (120)
 #2 in NL in home runs (19)

Taylor Douthit
 #3 in NL in stolen bases (23)

Flint Rhem
 NL leader in wins (20)

1926 World Series

Farm system

References

External links
1926 St. Louis Cardinals at Baseball Reference
1926 St. Louis Cardinals team page at www.baseball-almanac.com

St. Louis Cardinals seasons
Saint Louis Cardinals season
National League champion seasons
World Series champion seasons
St Louis